Angelique Kerber was the two-time defending champion, but she lost in the second round to Kristina Mladenovic.

Laura Siegemund won the title, defeating Mladenovic in the final, 6–1, 2–6, 7–6(7–5).

As a result of Kerber's loss, Serena Williams regained the world No. 1 ranking, despite being on pregnancy leave. This tournament also marked the return of Maria Sharapova to the WTA Tour, after serving a 15-month suspension for doping offences.

Seeds 
The top four seeds receive a bye into the second round.

Draw

Finals

Top half

Bottom half

Qualifying

Seeds

Qualifiers

Lucky loser

Draw

First qualifier

Second qualifier

Third qualifier

Fourth qualifier

External links 
 Main draw
 Qualifying draw

Porsche Tennis Grand Prix Singles
2017 Women's Singles